Patrick O'Neill (born March 20, 1956) is an American former handball player who competed in the 1976 Summer Olympics.

In 1976 O'Neill was part of the American team which finished tenth in the Olympic tournament. He played two matches.

External links
 Profile at sports-reference.com

1956 births
Living people
American male handball players
Olympic handball players of the United States
Handball players at the 1976 Summer Olympics
20th-century American people